Laiyangosaurus ("Laiyang lizard") is a genus of saurolophine hadrosaurid from the Late Cretaceous of China. It is known from one species, L.youngi, found in the Laiyang Basin within the province of Shandong.

Classification
Laiyangosaurus is a member of the saurolophine tribe Edmontosaurini. A number of specimens referred to Laiyangosaurus (IVPP V23405.1, V23403.1, V23402.1, V23404, V23402.7) apparently belong to kritosaurin and lambeosaurine hadrosaurids.

Habitat
The Wangshi Series of Shandong Province has yielded a considerable amount of fossil material, including the remains of insects, plants and other vertebrates, including dinosaurs and dinosaur eggs.

See also

 Timeline of hadrosaur research

References

Fossil taxa described in 2019
Saurolophines
Late Cretaceous dinosaurs of Asia
Ornithischian genera